Muireadhach mac Aedh, Lord of Clann Cosgraigh, died 1124.  He was a distant cousin of the Muintir Murchada, of whom the O'Flahertys were chiefs.

The Annals of the Four Masters, sub anno 1124, state that Muireadhach (i.e., lord of Clann-Cosgraigh), the son of Aedh, son of Ruaidhri, died an ecclesiastic.  John O'Donovan, who edited the 1856 publishing of the Annals of the Four Masters, inserts "O'Flaithbheartaigh" after Ruaidhri's name, but this appears to be a mistake; O'Donovan confuses the Lord of Clann Cosgraigh with another Muireadhach mac Aedh mac Ruaidhri, who was an actual O'Flaherty.  The McHughs, according to O'Flaherty, descend from Dungalaigh m. Cenn Faelad m. Colgan in generation 12 of his genealogical table, whereas the Muireadhach m. Aedh m. Ruaidri O'Flaherty is in generation 111 in the lineage of the O'Flahertys, as cited in O'Hart.

Muireadhach's immediate descendants adopted the surname Mac Aedha.  The surname is now rendered McHugh or Hughes, less commonly McGagh (better reflecting the Irish pronunciation).

Genealogy

 Genealach Mec Aodha/The genealogy of Mac Aodha: Donnchadh s. Maol Eachlainn, the archbishop, s. Maol Eachlainn s. Donnchadh s. Aodh s. Tadhg s. Muireadhach s. Aodh s. Ruaidhrí s. Coscrach s. Flann Abhradh s. Gamhnán s. Conaing s. Muirgheas s. Coscrach Mór s. Donn s. Cumasach s. Dúnghal s. Ceann Faoladh s. Colga s. Aodh s. Seanach s. Duach Teangumha s. Fearghus s. Muireadhach Mál (the king) s. Eóghan Sréabh s. Duach Galach s. Brian.

From Leabhar na nGenealach, 201.6, pp. 442–43, volume I.

See also

 Ruaidhri Mac Aedha, Lord of Clan Cosgraigh, died 1170.
 Máel Sechlain Mac Áeda, Archbishop of Tuam, died 1348.
 Paddy McHugh, Independent T.D., born 1953.
 Ann Maire McHugh of Tuam, 9/11 victim.
 Tom McHugh (Councillor), Mayor of County Galway 2009-10.

References

 Medieval Ireland: Territorial, Political and Economic Divisions, Paul MacCotter, Four Courts Press, 2008. 
http://www.rootsweb.ancestry.com/~irlkik/ihm/connacht.htm#aid
 http://celt.ucc.ie/publishd.html

Medieval Gaels from Ireland
Irish lords
12th-century Irish people
People from County Galway